Nicholas Stavrou (born 26 August 1969 in Worthing, England) is an English football midfielder and coach, who played thirteen years of professional indoor soccer with the Dallas Sidekicks. He currently serves as head coach of Fort Worth Vaqueros FC in the National Premier Soccer League and as the assistant coach for the Mesquite Outlaws of the Major Arena Soccer League.

Player

College
A standout midfielder at Cleveland State University, Stavrou was a 1990 Second Team All-America. A two-time MVP of the Mid-Continent Conference, Stavrou was honored as a defender in 1989 and a midfielder in 1990. The all-time leader in games played at Cleveland State (82), he also ranks fourth among the school's all-time points leaders (112), fourth in goals (46), and tied for ninth in assists (20). In 2002, he was inducted into the school's Athletic Hall of Fame.

Professional
After a stellar college career, Stavrou was selected by the Dallas Sidekicks in the second round of the 1991 Major Indoor Soccer League, (MISL) draft. He played 10 seasons with the team, which played in the MISL, World Indoor Soccer League, Continental Indoor Soccer League (CISL) in 1993, and the Premiere Soccer Alliance (PSA) in 1998. A member of the Dallas Sidekicks MISL championship teams in 1993, 1998 and 2001, he earned second team All-PSA honors in 1998 and second team All-WISL honors in 2000. Stavrou scored 199 goals in 292 games with the Sidekicks from 1991–2004. In November 2012, he began playing for the new Dallas Sidekicks of the Professional Arena Soccer League.Stavrou retired as a player on July 1, 2014. He was named Director of Soccer Operations for the Dallas Sidekicks on the same date. These decisions were announced via a detailed press release on August 11, 2014. He scored his 1st MISL professional goal on November 4, 1989 against St. Louis. He is one of a select group of 8 players too have won 2 professional championships with the sidekicks.

Coach
After his playing career ended, he was a women's soccer assistant coach at Texas Woman's University (TWU) in Denton, Texas, and for youth teams around Dallas. 

On 22 July 2019, Stavrou was named to the first-ever coaching staff for the Major Arena Soccer League's Mesquite Outlaws. Stavrou will be working alongside two other former Dallas Sidekicks players, with Tatu as head coach and Sagu as goalkeepers coach.

References

External links
Dallas Sidekick: Nick Stavrou

1969 births
Living people
Cleveland State Vikings men's soccer players
Continental Indoor Soccer League players
English footballers
English expatriate footballers
Dallas Sidekicks (CISL) players
Dallas Sidekicks (original MISL) players
Dallas Sidekicks (WISL) players
Dallas Sidekicks (2001–2008 MISL) players
Dallas Sidekicks (PASL/MASL) players
Major Indoor Soccer League (1978–1992) players
Major Indoor Soccer League (2001–2008) players
World Indoor Soccer League players
Association football midfielders
Major Arena Soccer League coaches
Sportspeople from Worthing
English football managers
Texas Woman's Pioneers coaches
National Premier Soccer League coaches